Oswestry School is an ancient public school (English independent boarding and day school), located in Oswestry, Shropshire, England. It was founded in 1407 as a 'free' school, being independent of the church. This gives it the distinction of being the second-oldest 'free' school in the country, between Winchester College (founded 1382) and Eton College (1440). (See also the article on early grammar schools.)

Due to the fact that these Renaissance schools focused heavily on subjects such as Latin grammar, Oswestry School has long been known locally as 'The Grammar School' even during the period when Oswestry had modern state grammar schools. Oswestry School should also not be confused with other secondary schools in Oswestry, such as the Marches School.

One of the school's earliest sites, dating from the 15th century, can still be seen adjacent to St Oswald's Parish Church. It is currently used as the town's visitor and information centre, incorporating a coffee shop and exhibitions.

The present-day senior school is located on Upper Brook Street and the junior school is based at Bellan House on Church Street. Bellan House Preparatory School was a completely separate institution until its amalgamation in the 1970s.

History
Oswestry School was founded in 1407 by David Holbache, Member of Parliament for Shropshire and Shrewsbury, and his wife Guinevere. They are also known by their Welsh names: Dafydd ab Ieuan and Gwenhwyfar ferch Ieuan.

Later in the 15th century it took up residence in the ancient half-timbered building close to the Parish Church of St Oswald. The school later attracted the attention of Queen Elizabeth I and Oliver Cromwell; the former gave to the school an endowment of "forty shillings per annum" to help with its running, and the latter dismissed the headmaster at the time for being a "delinquent" (too "Royalist"). Early archive records show that a small percentage of the subsidised school-fees was set aside to pay for cockfighting, the pupil entertainment of that time.

Changes to the governance of the school in the mid-17th century saw a gradual transition from the lay trustees to a group of lay and clerical governors headed by the Bishop of St Asaph, who, from that time on, would appoint the Headmaster. Henceforth, these would be ordained men, a tradition which would extend into the 20th century.

Increasing numbers in the mid-18th century meant a move for the school to its present site on land next to the battlefield where in 642 AD King Oswald was defeated by King Penda. The Georgian building was constructed in 1776 on land leased (and later bought) from a local landed aristocrat. Its closest neighbour, the neo-Gothic Victorian chapel, built in 1863, stands looking across at St Oswald's Maes-y-llan battlefield, now the school's extensive playing fields.

A major change took place in 1972: with the admission of girls, the school became co-educational. Shortly after this, the local pre-preparatory school, Bellan House, was taken over, thereby eventually allowing the school to offer education spanning the widest possible range – now 4 years up to 18. Previously, Oswestry School solely admitted boys. Alumni of Oswestry School are referred to as Old Oswestrians.

Oswestry School celebrated its 600th anniversary in 2007.

Douglas Robb, who was headmaster from 2010 to 2014, had taught at Prince Edward School in Zimbabwe and developed links between the two schools.

Houses
Oswestry School has had numerous houses over the years, including both 'competitive' and 'residential' houses. At different eras the house might have identified a pupil as day/boarder, boy/girl, or junior/senior. There are currently three boarding houses: School House, Holbache and Guinevere. Senior boarders and day pupils now mingle in the 'competitive' houses: Burnaby, Donne, Oswald and Spooner. Here are just some of the current and historical houses:

Burnaby - Formerly a competitive house for day students, now mixed
Donne - Formerly a competitive house for day students, now mixed
Guinevere - A boarding house for girls situated at The Quarry
Holbache - This started life as a senior boys' boarding house on Welsh Walls, acquired following WWII. It had previously been the old Cottage Hospital and was reputed to have retained its beds, warmth and ghosts. This building has since been redeveloped as apartments. In January 2006 it reopened on school grounds as home to sixth form boys. It has been both a residential and a competitive house.
Oswald - Formerly a competitive house for boarders, now mixed
School House - A boarding house for boys up to 5th form, based in the oldest part of the present school buildings, which date from 1776. 
Spooner - Formerly a competitive house for boarders, now mixed

School Song
In the 19th century, an Old Oswestrian wrote the school's Latin song, 'Hymnus Oswestriensium', which is informally known by its first words, 'Gaude Plebs'.

'Gaude Plebs', though written for Oswestry School, also became the official song of the nearby Moreton Hall School. Moreton Hall was founded in 1913 by the widow and daughters of Oswestry's late headmaster, John Jordan Lloyd-Williams. It primarily educated girls, who were not then eligible to attend Oswestry School.

The song is as follows:

Gaude, plebs redemptionis
 
Gaude, tantis aucta bonis

Dei beneficio;

Omni labi propulsata

Mens exultet, provocata

Linguae ministerio.

Pro defunctis te laudandum

Pro viventibus, orandum,

Celebramus, domine.

Tu rem publicam beasti,

Tu maiores secundasti,

Noster et sis hodie.

Agimus pro fundatore

Et pro multo largitore

Grates laeto pectore.

At ni tu das incrementum,

Nil est aurum, nil argentums,

Nil humana sapere.

Quicquid bonum, sis tutela,

Quicquid malum, sis medela,

Rite gerens omnia;

Et, quot sumus hic sodales,

Fac sanctorum commensales

In perenni gloria.

Amen

Notable Old Oswestrians

Notable pupils and staff of the school include:

List of Heads
1974–1985: Frank E. Gerstenberg MA (Cantab)
1985–1993: I. G. Templeton MA (Edinburgh)
2000–2010: P. D. Stockdale BSc MEd
2010–2014: Douglas Robb MA (Edinburgh)
2014–2021: Julian Noad
2021-2022: Lyndsay Lang (acting)
2022-: Peter Middleton

References

External links
School website
ISI Inspection Reports

Educational institutions established in the 15th century
1407 establishments in England
Boarding schools in Shropshire
Private schools in Shropshire
Oswestry